Robert Nyholm (born March 7, 1988) is a Finnish former professional ice hockey forward who played in the Finnish Liiga for HIFK and the Espoo Blues. He was selected by the Columbus Blue Jackets in the 5th round (129th overall) of the 2006 NHL Entry Draft.

Career statistics

Regular season and playoffs

International

References

External links

1988 births
Living people
Columbus Blue Jackets draft picks
Espoo Blues players
HIFK (ice hockey) players
Kiekko-Vantaa players
Kingston Frontenacs players
Finnish ice hockey right wingers
Vaasan Sport players
People from Jakobstad
Sportspeople from Ostrobothnia (region)